Karawang Regency is a regency (kabupaten) of West Java, Indonesia. The town of Karawang is its administrative centre. The regency covers an area of 1,753.27 km2 and had a population of 2,127,791 people at the 2010 Census, which grew to 2,361,019 at the 2020 Census. The official estimate for mid 2021 was 2,406,900 for a density of 1,372.8 people per km2.  The regency borders Bekasi and Bogor regencies in the west, the Java Sea in the north, Subang Regency in the east, Purwakarta Regency in the southeast, and Cianjur Regency in the south. The regency lies on the eastern outskirts of Metropolitan Jakarta, just outside the Jabodetabek region, and is the site of industrial activity (like factories).

The area continues to grow which marked the establishment of new factories by domestic and multinational companies in industrial areas. However, due to ever expanding Jakarta (primarily from the eastward expansion of the Jakarta-Cikampek Toll Road and the Cikampek-Palimanan Toll Road), it has seen a heavy influx of housing developments as well and a surge of people.

Administrative districts
Karawang Regency is divided into thirty districts (kecamatan) comprising 309 administrative villages (desa and Kelurahan). The districts are listed below with their areas and populations at the 2010 Census and the 2020 Census, together with the official estimate for mid 2021. The table includes the location of the district headquarters, the number of administrative villages in each district (a total of 297 rural desa and 12 urban kelurahan), and its postal code.

The 12 urban villages (kelurahan) comprise all 8 villages in Karawang Barat District, plus 4 (out of 8 villages) in Karawang Timur District

History

On 9 December 1947, a massacre was carried out in Rawagede (now located in the village of Balongsari, Rawamerta, Karawang), between Karawang and Bekasi, by the Royal Netherlands East Indies Army. A total of 431 residents became victims of this massacre.

Culture

Topography
Most of Karawang Regency consists of a broad coastal plain; it lies on the northern coast of Java, and is the result of the deposition of sedimentary rocks formed by loose materials, especially marine sediments and volcanic alluvium. While in the middle of the regency are hills mostly formed by sedimentary rocks, in the south there is a mountain (Sanggabuana) with a height of about 1,291 metres above sea level. The regency is roughly equidistant from Jakarta and Bandung, and the two metropolitan areas have a combined home population of over 40 million people.

Climate

Demography
The estimated population in mid 2020 was 2,370,488 comprising 1,213,004 male and 1,157,484 female. The general population is ethnically Sundanese, with Islam adherents comprising 98.17% of the population according to the 2010 census.

Sport
The football club Persika Karawang, which plays in Liga 2, is based in Karawang's Singaperbangsa Stadium. The city had also hosted the Madura United F.C. between 2010 and 2012 when it was known as Pelita Jaya Karawang.

Industrial estates
Currently, according to the data of the Indonesian Industrial Zone Association (HKI), there are at least nine major industrial areas, namely Karawang New Industry City (KNIC), Karawang International Industrial City (KIIC), Bukit Indah City, Surya Cipta Industrial Area, Karawang Jabar Industrial Estate, Podomoro Industrial Park, Kujang Industrial Area, Karawang Mitrakarawang Industry, GT Tech Park Karawang, and Artha Industrial Hill.

New airport
A new main airport for Greater Jakarta and the heavily populated surrounding area is planned for bids in 2014; it is located within the regency (in Ciampel and Pangkalan districts), to provide relief to severely congested Soekarno–Hatta International Airport, the nation's largest gateway, as well as overloaded Husein Sastranegara International Airport in Bandung.  The new airport is expected to have space for 4 long runways  and 2 jumbo terminals.  The current airport takes up some 18 square kilometers of land, in all likelihood a similar allocation of land will be required.

Transportation
Trans-Java main rail line runs across the central part of the Regency, with a stop at Karawang Station. Likewise, Jakarta's main airport is also mulled for the regency. The Jakarta–Cikampek Toll Road runs through the regency, connecting to Cipularang Toll Road which goes to Purwakarta and Bandung. This district will also be crossed  by Jakarta-Bandung a fast train.

Karawang adipati (regents) during the Mataram and colonial periods
Prince Singaperbangsa (1633-1677), under the title Adipati Kertabumi III
Raden Anom Wirasuta (1677-1721), son of Singaperbangsa
Raden Jayanegara (1721-1731), son of Wirasuta, under the title Adipati Panatayuda II
Raden Singanegara (1752-1786), son of Jayanegara, under the title Adipati Panatayuda IV
Raden Singasari (1786-1809), son-in-law of Singanegara, under the title Raden Adipati Aria Singasari
Raden Aria Sastradipura (1809-1811), son of Singanegara
Raden Adipati Suryalaga (1811-1813), eldest son of Raden Adipati Suryalaga, adipati of Sumedang
Raden Aria Sastradipura (1811-1820), son of Singanegara
Raden Adipati Suryanata (1821-1829), son-in-law of Sastradipura
Raden Adipati Suryawinata (1829-1849), younger brother of Suryanata
Raden Muhammad Enoh (1849-1854), under the title Raden Sastranegara
Raden Adipati Sumadipura (1854-1863), son of Sastradipura, under the title Raden Tumenggung Aria Sastradiningrat I, builds the pendopo (regent palace) and the Grand Mosque of Purwakarta
Raden Adikusumah (1883-1886), under the title Raden Adipati Sastradiningrat II
Raden Surya Kusumah (1886-1911), son of Adikusumah, under the title Raden Adipati Sastradiningrat III
Raden Tumenggung Aria Gandanagara (1911-1925), younger brother of Surya Kusumah, under the title Raden Adipati Sastradiningrat III
Raden Adipati Aria Suryamiharja (1925-1942)
Raden Panduwinata (1942-1945), under the title Raden Kanjeng Pandu Suriadiningrat, last bupati to reside in Purwakarta, moves to Subang.

References

External links